The Alberta Stock Exchange (ASE) was a stock exchange based in Calgary, Alberta, established in 1913. It featured mostly mining, resource exploration, and oil sands stocks.  The ASE was the original listing exchange for Bre-X, one of the biggest corporate frauds in Canadian history.

On November 29, 1999, the ASE was merged into the Canadian Venture Exchange (CDNX), along with the Vancouver Stock Exchange (VSE) and the minor-cap stocks from the Bourse de Montréal (MSE). The corporate headquarters of the new CDNX remained in Calgary.

See also
 
List of former stock exchanges in the Americas 
 List of stock exchange mergers in the Americas
 List of stock exchanges

References

Financial services companies established in 1913
Financial services companies disestablished in 1999
Stock exchanges in Canada
Economy of Calgary
Financial services companies based in Alberta
Defunct financial services companies of Canada
1913 establishments in Alberta
1999 disestablishments in Alberta
Defunct stock exchanges